TASB, or thioasymbescaline, is a series of lesser-known psychedelic drugs similar in structure to asymbescaline and to mescaline. They were first synthesized by Alexander Shulgin and written up in his book PiHKAL (Phenethylamines i Have Known And Loved).  Very little is known about their dangers or toxicity.

TASB compounds

3-TASB
Dosage: 160 mg or greater

Duration: 10–18 hours

Effects: Mild stimulative effects

4-TASB
Dosage: 60–100 mg

Duration: 10–15 hours

Effects: Negative effects

5-TASB
Dosage: 160 mg or greater

Duration: 8 hours

Effects: Warmth at extremities, diarrhea

See also 

 Phenethylamine
 Psychedelics, dissociatives and deliriants
 PiHKAL
 Mescaline
 Asymbescaline

External links 
 3-TASB entry in PiHKAL
 3-TASB entry in PiHKAL • info
 4-TASB entry in PiHKAL
 4-TASB entry in PiHKAL • info
 5-TASB entry in PiHKAL
 5-TASB entry in PiHKAL • info

Psychedelic phenethylamines